Monte Colombin is a mountain in Liguria, northern Italy, part of the Alps.  It is located in the provinces of province of Imperia in Italy and Alpes-Maritimes in France. It lies at an elevation of 1,088 meters.

SOIUSA classification 
According to the SOIUSA (International Standardized Mountain Subdivision of the Alps) the mountain can be classified in the following way:
 main part = Western Alps
 major sector =  South Western Alps
 section = Ligurian Alps
 subsection = Alpi del Marguareis
 supergroup = Catena del Saccarello
 group = Gruppo del Monte Saccarello
 subgroup = Costiera del Monte Pietra Vecchia
 code = I/A-1.II-A.1.f

Access to the summit 
The mountain can  be easily accessed from Airole, Olivetta San Michele, Breil-sur-Roya and Rocchetta Nervina.

References

Mountains of the Ligurian Alps
Mountains of Liguria
Mountains of Alpes-Maritimes
One-thousanders of Italy
One-thousanders of France
Mountains partially in France